Still Got That Hunger is the sixth studio album by English rock band the Zombies, released on 9 October 2015. The band funded production of the album through the crowdfunding web site PledgeMusic, receiving donations from 958 pledgers and reaching 143% of its funding goal.

Two of the songs on the album are remakes of earlier recordings by members of the band. "I Want You Back Again" was originally released by the Zombies as a single in 1965 and in the intervening time has been covered in live performances by Tom Petty, a self-professed fan of the band. "Now I Know I'll Never Get Over You" was originally released by Colin Blunstone on his 2009 solo album The Ghost of You and Me.

Two of the songs also are based on two Argent compositions included in Barbara Thompson's Ghost (1982) album with Rod Argent, both instrumental, "Movin On" and "Little Girl," the latter renamed "Little One."

Track listing
All tracks composed by Rod Argent, except where noted.

Personnel
The Zombies
Colin Blunstone - lead vocals
Rod Argent - keyboards, backing and lead vocals 
Tom Toomey - guitar, backing vocals
Jim Rodford - bass, backing vocals
Steve Rodford - drums

References

2015 albums
The Zombies albums